Don West may refer to:

Don West (educator) (1906–1992), American writer, poet, educator and civil-rights activist
Don West (wrestling) (1963–2022), American pitchman, television personality and professional wrestling broadcaster
Major Don West, a fictional character on the TV series Lost in Space
Don West, a lawyer in the trial of George Zimmerman in 2013

See also
Donald West Harward, American philosopher